69 Boyz is an American Miami bass and hip hop duo: Van "Thrill Da Playa" Bryant, from Jacksonville, Florida, and Barry "Fast" Wright, from Orlando, Florida, United States. The group was initiated by Thrill Da Playa with the assistance of producers C.C. Lemonhead and Jay Ski (of Chill Deal, Quad City DJs, and 95 South).

History

1992–1993: Beginnings
In 1992, Thrill da Playa and Fast Cash teamed up to form 69 Boyz, the group.

1994–1996: 199Quad and Sunset Park
The group had success in the summer of 1994 with its first single, "Tootsee Roll", from their debut album, 199Quad. The song went platinum and reached number 8 on the Billboard Hot 100 and number 9 on the R&B chart. The second single, "Kitty Kitty", peaked at number 55 on the Billboard Hot 100. The band was nominated for three Soul Train Music Awards in 1995.

In 1996, the duo recorded a song for the soundtrack of Sunset Park, called "Hoop In Yo Face".

1997–1998: The Wait is Over
Their second album, The Wait is Over, came out in July 1998 (which was written and recorded in 1997) and featured the single "Woof Woof", which was written for the feature film Dr. Dolittle, starring Eddie Murphy. The song reached number 31 on the Billboard Hot 100.

1999–2000: 2069
Their third album, 2069, was released in April 2000 and it featured one single, "How We Roll".

2001–2002: Trunk Funk 101
Their fourth and final album, Trunk Funk 101, came out in September 2001 and like its predecessor also only had one single, "She's Skurred".

Discography

Studio albums

Singles

References

External links
 
 69 Boyz at Discogs

Musical groups from Jacksonville, Florida
Musical groups established in 1992
Southern hip hop groups
Miami bass groups
1992 establishments in Florida
Big Beat Records (American record label) artists
Interscope Records artists